Dan Woren is an American voice actor who is known for providing voice work for anime, television, and video games. His role was voicing Roy Fokker in the Robotech series in the 1980s. Other major voice roles include Jagi in Fist of the North Star, Byakuya Kuchiki in Bleach, Yang Newman in Macross Plus, and Caster in Fate/Zero. He has narrated over 60 audiobooks and won various awards from AudioFile magazine.

Filmography

Anime

Film 

 Attack of the Super Monsters - Captain Jim Starbuck, Ashtoreth (voice)
 Bleach: The Diamond Dust Rebellion - Byakuya Kuchiki
 Bleach: Fade to Black - Byakuya Kuchiki
 Bleach: Hell Verse - Byakuya Kuchiki
 Dragon Ball (edit of movies 1 and 3) - Turtle, M.C., Restaurant Owner
 Magnum Farce (IMDb) - Uncle Spilky, Thug 3, Cop 3, (various others)
 Space Adventure Cobra: The Movie - Cobra

Dubbing 

 Dynamo Duck - Morris, Bugsy, Manny Mankwrench, Smokey DuBois, Hypnocat (voice)
 Power Rangers Zeo - Hydro-Contaminator, Drill Master (voices, uncredited)

Video games 

 Bleach: Shattered Blade - Byakuya Kuchiki
 Bleach: The 3rd Phantom - Byakuya Kuchiki
 Bleach: Soul Resurrección - Byakuya Kuchiki, Rudbornn Chelute
 Heroes Chronicles series – Narrator, Tarnum
 Heroes of Might and Magic IV - Tarnum
 Marvel vs. Capcom 3: Fate of Two Worlds - Arthur
 Star Wars: Battlefront 2 - Uncredited roles

Live action

Audiobooks

References

 
 "ActorsE Chat Show" with host Yi Tian on Actors Entertainment

External links
 
 
 
 
 

Living people
American male video game actors
American male voice actors
American male television actors
American male film actors
Robotech cast and crew
Male actors from San Diego
20th-century American male actors
21st-century American male actors
Year of birth missing (living people)